SQL Star International Limited was an IT services company headquartered in Hyderabad, India. Its three main divisions are Knowledge Services, Enterprise Services and e-Governance. It was also listed on the Bombay Stock Exchange. (BSE: 532249)

The company provides IT Education to corporates and individuals. In March 2008, SQL Star launched its e-learning portal - thelearningport.com. It is also an authorized training partner for Red Hat, SUN and Oracle. The company also markets an embedded Linux platform called Embinux.In February 2014 its authorization got canceled.

References

External links
Official Website

Companies listed on the Bombay Stock Exchange
Information technology companies of India
Companies based in Hyderabad, India
Indian companies established in 1987
1987 establishments in Andhra Pradesh
Technology companies established in 1987